This is a list of the Danish Singles Chart number-one hits of 1998 from the International Federation of the Phonographic Industry and Nielsen Soundscan. They were provided through Billboard magazine under the "Hits of the World" section.

Chart history

See also
1998 in music

References

1998 in Denmark
1998 record charts
Lists of number-one songs in Denmark